Raminta Popovienė is a Lithuanian music educator and a politician from the Social Democratic Party of Lithuania. She has been a member of Seimas since 2012.

Early life
Born in Zarasai on 5 May 1970, Raminta Popovienė did her schooling at the Ąžuolas Gymnasium. She received her music teacher and choir conductor diploma from the Lithuanian Academy of Music and Theatre (1988–94) and also holds a master's degree in music education.

Career
After completing her masters, Popovienė became a senior supervisor at the Lithuanian Academy of Music. From 2000–07, she was a chief specialist at the Kaunas District Municipality's Department of Culture, Education and Sports. In 2007 she was appointed the Kaunas District Social Services Centre's director and was promoted to the post of deputy director of Administration of Kaunas District Municipality in 2011.

A member of the Social Democratic Party of Lithuania, Popovienė won the 2012 Lithuanian parliamentary election and served on the house committees for Social Affairs and Labour, Youth and Sport Affairs and was a member of the Lithuanian delegation that visited the Polish parliament. She was re-elected in 2016 and in her second term serves on the Commission for Suicide and Violence Prevention and Migration Commission besides being the deputy chair of the Committee on Culture.

References

1970 births
Living people
21st-century Lithuanian women politicians
21st-century Lithuanian politicians
Lithuanian educators
Members of the Seimas
Lithuanian Academy of Music and Theatre alumni
Women members of the Seimas